Buzz off may refer to:

 Buzz-Off, a character in Mattel's He-Man and the Masters of the Universe
 Buzz Off, a 2010 book by Hannah Reed